Calaxis is a genus of gastropods belonging to the family Ferussaciidae.

The species of this genus are found in eastern Mediterranean.

Species:

Calaxis cypria 
Calaxis hierosolymarum

References

Ferussaciidae